Massimo D'Alema (born 20 April 1949) is an Italian politician and journalist who was the 53rd prime minister of Italy from 1998 to 2000. He was Deputy Prime Minister of Italy and Minister of Foreign Affairs from 2006 to 2008. D'Alema also served for a time as national secretary of the Democratic Party of the Left (PDS). The media has referred to him as Leader Maximo due to his first name and for his dominant position in the left-wing coalitions during the Second Republic.

Earlier in his career, D'Alema was a member of the Italian Communist Party and was the first former communist to become prime minister of a NATO country and the only former communist prime minister of Italy.

Biography
D'Alema was born in Rome on 20 April 1949, the son of Giuseppe D'Alema, a communist politician. He is married to Linda Giuva, a professor at the University of Siena, and has two children, Giulia and Francesco. He later became a notable member of the Italian Communist Party (PCI), the bulk of which in 1991 became the Democratic Party of the Left (PDS) and in 1998 merged into Democrats of the Left (DS).

In 1998, succeeding Romano Prodi, he became Prime Minister as the leader of The Olive Tree centre-left coalition. He was the first former Communist to become prime minister of a NATO country and the first Prime Minister born after Italy became a Republic in 1946. While D'Alema was Prime Minister, Italy took part in the NATO bombing of the Federal Republic of Yugoslavia in 1999. The attack was supported by Silvio Berlusconi and the centre-right opposition, while the far left strongly contested it.

In the internal life of his party, mostly during its transition from PCI to PDS, D'Alema stressed that its roots in Marxism should be renovated, with the aim to create a modern Western European social-democratic party. He has been the director of L'Unità, formerly the official newspaper of the PCI, which subsequently became the newspaper of the DS.

D'Alema was Member of the European Parliament for Southern Italy with the Democrats of the Left, part of the Party of European Socialists group, and sat on the European Parliament's Committee on Fisheries and its Committee on Foreign Affairs until he stood down following his election to the Chamber of Deputies in Italy.

Following Romano Prodi's win in the 2006 Italian general election, D'Alema was initially tipped to become President of the Italian Republic once the Chamber of Deputies reconvened, but D'Alema himself stepped back, endorsing the official candidate of the centre-left coalition, Giorgio Napolitano, who was elected. Immediately following the April 2006 election, he was proposed as the future President of the Chamber of Deputies. The Communist Refoundation Party strongly pushed for Fausto Bertinotti to become the next President. After a couple of days of heated debate, D'Alema stepped back to prevent a fracture between political parties, an act applauded by his allies. The same month, he was appointed as Deputy Prime Minister and Minister of Foreign Affairs in the new Prodi government. He served in those posts until Prodi's government fell and Berlusconi's centre-right coalition prevailed in the 2008 Italian general election. D'Alema was re-elected to the Chamber of Deputies in this election as part of the recently formed Democratic Party.

2006 Israel-Lebanon conflict
While Italian Foreign Minister in the 2006–2008 Romano Prodi centre-left government, D'Alema took a pro-active diplomatic stance during the 2006 Lebanon War. Italy led negotiations with the Israeli foreign minister Tzipi Livni and was proposed by Israel to head the multinational peacekeeping mission Unifil, although the dangers of the mission for Italian troops sparked warnings from the centre-right opposition that it could prove a "kamikaze" mission, with the peacekeepers sandwiched between Israel and the well-armed Hezbollah. D’Alema pledged Italy's willingness to enforce the United Nations resolution on Lebanon and urged other European Union member states to do the same because the stability of the Middle East should be a chief concern for Europeans.

On the European scene

D'Alema was briefly a Member of the European Parliament from 2004 to 2006. Since 2003 he has been member of the scientific committee of Michel Rocard and Dominique Strauss-Kahn's association "A gauche en Europe". He still figures on the European scene; he signed the Soros letter ('As concerned Europeans') and has called for a stronger European integration. Three year after the peace-keeping role in the 2006 Israeli-Lebanon war, D'Alema became one of the favourite candidates for the charges of president of the European Council, high representative of the Union for Foreign Affairs and Security Policy, or secretary-general for the Council Secretariat, without being appointed.

Since 30 June 2010, D'Alema has been the president of the Foundation for European Progressive Studies (FEPS), the political foundation of the Party of European Socialists. He has been a friend of the Italian banker and Freemason Vincenzo De Bustis.

Electoral history

First-past-the-post elections

Career

Party
 1975–1980: National Secretary of the FGCI
 1981–1986: Regional Secretary of the PCI in Apulia
 1986–1989: editor of the daily newspaper L'Unità
 1986–1992: Member of the PCI/PDS national secretariat
 1992–1994: chairman of the PDS members of Parliament
 1994–1999: leader of the PDS-DS
 Chairman of the DS
 Since 1996: vice-chairman of the Socialist International

Institutions
 1970–1976: town councillor of Pisa
 1985–1987: regional Councillor of Apulia
 1987–2004: chairman of the parliamentary group
 1987–2013: Member of the Chamber of Deputies
 1996–1998: Chairman of the Committee for Constitutional Reform
 1998–2000: Prime Minister of Italy
 2006–2008: Minister of Foreign Affairs

Awards
 Supreme awards (from the Republic of Chile, South Korea, and Palestine)
 Officer of the Legion of Honour of the French Republic

See also
2004 European Parliament election in Italy

Books
D'Alema published eight books, half of which with Mondadori, which is controlled by Fininvest, the family holding company of Silvio Berlusconi.

Dialogo su Berlinguer ("Dialogue on Berlinguer"), with Paul Ginsborg, Giunti, 1994, ;
Un paese normale. La sinistra e il futuro dell'Italia ("A normal country. The left wing and Italy's future"), Mondadori, 1995, ;
Progettare il futuro ("Shaping the future"), Bompiani, 1996, ;
La sinistra nell'Italia che cambia ("The left wing in the changing Italy"), Feltrinelli, 1997, 
La grande occasione. L'Italia verso le riforme ("The great chance. Italy towards reforms"), Mondadori, 1997, ;
Kosovo. Gli italiani e la guerra ("Kosovo. Italians and war"), with Federico Rampini, Mondadori, 1999, ;
Oltre la paura ("Beyond fear"), Mondadori, 2002, .

References

External links

 
 
 
 

|-

|-

|-

|-

|-

1949 births
Foreign ministers of Italy
Article One (political party) politicians
Democratic Party (Italy) politicians
Democratic Party (Italy) MEPs
Democratic Party of the Left politicians
Democrats of the Left MEPs
Italian socialists
Italian Communist Party politicians
20th-century Italian politicians
Living people
MEPs for Italy 2004–2009
21st-century Italian politicians
Politicians from Rome
Prime Ministers of Italy
University of Pisa alumni
Deputy Prime Ministers of Italy
L'Unità editors